Pseudepimolis incisa is a moth of the family Erebidae. It was described by Walter Rothschild in 1909. It is found in Costa Rica, French Guiana, Brazil, the upper Amazon region, Venezuela and Bolivia.

References

Phaegopterina
Moths described in 1909